The Corps Hannovera Göttingen is one of the oldest German Student Corps, a Studentenverbindung or student corporation founded on January 18, 1809 at the Georg August University of Göttingen by students like Georg Kloss. The name was chosen because the founders had their home residences in the Kingdom of Hanover. As a corps it is a founder member (1848) of the Kösener Senioren-Convents-Verband (KSCV), the oldest governing body of such student associations in both Germany and Austria.

Hannovera commits itself still to the principles of academic fencing as well as the common principles of tolerance and democracy shared by all Corps of the KSCV. Its members wear red and blue couleur (red cap and tricoloured sash) on official occasions. Hannovera's Latin motto is Nunquam retrorsum, fortes adiuvat fortuna! (engl: Never backward, fortune favours the bold).

Corps Hannovera officially regards the 18th of January 1809 as its founding date though it can be proved that there were similar gatherings of Hanoverian students in Göttingen as far back as 1735.

Corps Hannovera is also a founding member and stringent follower of the blaues Prinzip or blue principle (along with fellow cartel Corps  and ). The blue principle is a social principle which consists of the promotion of gentlemanly conduct and social behaviour in general. Flowing from these ideals Corps Hannovera host several social events in their club house (Corpshaus) which are generally regarded as some of the most coveted and exclusive social occasions in Göttingen.

The most famous member of Hannovera was Otto von Bismarck, who probably had the "wildest" time of his life in the course of his studies at Göttingen, where, owing to his excessive boisterousness, he was forced to live outside the town walls and was once placed under arrest for a period of ten days in the university jail (in German: Karzer). Other famous members of Corps Hanovera Göttingen were general Friedrich Balduin von Gagern, the leader of the liberal opposition in the Reichstag, Rudolf von Bennigsen, economist Wilhelm Roscher, poet Ernst Schulze, botanist Heinrich Wendland, surgeon Louis Stromeyer, geologist Otto Volger, fisheries expert Walther Herwig, the Imperial German ambassador to China and Japan Alfons Mumm von Schwarzenstein and Wolfgang Kapp.

The Corps has some members from the United Kingdom and the United States. One of them was the later physician Mitchell Campbell King from South Carolina, who belonged to the circle of Bismarck's American friends in Göttingen. During his stay at Gottingen in 1856 John Pierpont Morgan joined the Corps, but was "not a full fledged member" since he wanted to avoid a smite. Others have worked in the US and Canada like surgeon Hinrich Bitter-Suermann.

Further reading
 Rosco Weber: The German Corps in the Third Reich. Macmillan, London 1986
 Stephen Klimczuk, Gerald Warner: Secret Places, Hidden Sanctuaries: Uncovering Mysterious Sights, Symbols, and Societies, Sterling Publishing Company, 2009, p. 224-232 (The German University Corps)
 List of members of German student corps

References

External links

Corps Hannovera Göttingen (in German)
Jonathan Green: Armed and Courteous, Financial Times magazine, 3. January 2004, S. 16. 

Hannovera, Corps
University of Göttingen alumni
Student organizations established in 1809
Sports clubs established in the 1800s
1809 establishments in Germany
Otto von Bismarck
Göttingen